Arvonne Skelton Fraser (September 1, 1925 – August 7, 2018) was an American women's rights advocate and political campaigner. She held the position of Senior Fellow at the Humphrey Institute of Public Affairs, University of Minnesota, and from 1993–1994 was the U.S. Ambassador to the United Nations Commission on the Status of Women. She also managed the political campaigns of her husband Donald M. Fraser during his career, from 1954 to 1979.

Early life 
Fraser was born on September 1, 1925 in Lamberton, Minnesota, to parents Orland Delbert and Phyllis Dufrene Skelton. She grew up on their family farm and attended Lamberton High School, graduating in 1943. In 1948, she received a Bachelor of Arts degree in liberal arts from the University of Minnesota. While studying there, she had her first experience of working on a political campaign when she worked in the office of Hubert Humphrey’s U.S. Senate campaign.

Career 
Following graduation, Fraser began her career in Minnesota Democratic–Farmer–Labor Party (DFL) politics, editing the party newsletter and acting as secretary for the state chairperson. She became vice-chair of the party in 1956, a position she held until 1962. In 1960 Fraser was active in the Minnesotan Citizens for Kennedy campaign and co-chaired Arthur Naftalin's successful mayoral election campaign. She served on the Minneapolis Board of Public Welfare from 1961 to 1963, and she became active in the women's rights movement, serving as national president of Women's Equity Action League from 1972 to 1974 and as the first director of the WEAL Fund Intern Program.

In 1976, Fraser led the Carter-Mondale presidential campaign in the Upper Midwest. After the election victory, she was appointed Counselor, Office of Presidential Personnel in the Jimmy Carter administration, and later served as director of the Office of Women in Development at the United States Agency for International Development from 1977 to 1981. She was a U.S. representative to the United Nations Commission on the Status of Women, and was a member of the U.S. delegations to the first two UN World Conferences on Women.

Fraser was a senior fellow at the Humphrey Institute of Public Affairs, University of Minnesota, from 1982 to 1994. At the Humphrey Institute (now the Humphrey School), she directed the International Women's Rights Action Watch (IWRAW) and cofounded the school's Center on Women and Public Policy. In June 1986, Fraser entered the campaign for Lieutenant Governor of Minnesota alongside George Latimer; the pair lost the DFL primary. From 1993 to 1994, she served as U.S. Ambassador to the United Nations Commission on the Status of Women.

Alongside her own career, Fraser ran the political campaigns of her husband, including for his elections to the Minnesota Senate (1954–1962), the U.S. House of Representatives (1963–1979) and the mayoralty of Minneapolis (1980–1993). Every campaign she managed for him resulted in a successful election outcome.

Recognition 
In 1979, she received an Honorary Doctor of Laws from Macalester College. In 2007, she received the Outstanding Achievement Award from the University of Minnesota. In 1992, she received a Resourceful Woman Award for women's human rights from the Tides Foundation. In 1995, she received the Prominent Women in International Law Award, Women's Interest Group, American Society of International Law, becoming the first non-lawyer to receive this award.

Fraser also received the Louis B. Sohn Human Rights Award from the U.N. Association, the Superior Honor Award from the U.S. Agency for International Development, and the Elizabeth Boyer Award from WEAL. She received the Minneapolis YWCA’s Outstanding Achievement Award and the Minneapolis International Citizen Award.

The Arvonne Fraser Library in Dinkytown was named after her in 2019.

Personal life 
She married Perry Morgan in 1946; they divorced in 1949. In 1950, she married Donald M. Fraser, and the couple had six children (Thomas, Mary, John, Lois, Anne, and Jean) and seven grandchildren.

Fraser died on August 7, 2018 at her family retreat near the St. Croix River in Hudson, Wisconsin at the age of 92.

Selected bibliography

Books

Book chapters 
  A reprint of  Also available online through the University of Minnesota, Human Rights Library.

References 

1925 births
2018 deaths
American women's rights activists
Minnesota Democrats
People from Lamberton, Minnesota
University of Minnesota College of Liberal Arts alumni
Writers from Minnesota
Women in Minnesota politics
Ambassadors of the United States
21st-century American women